The women's team was an archery event held as part of the Archery at the 1996 Summer Olympics programme.

Results
The score for the team ranking round was the sum of the three archers' scores in the individual ranking round. No further shooting was done to determine team rankings.

Ranking round

Knockout stage

References

Sources
 Official Report
 

Archery at the 1996 Summer Olympics
1996 in women's archery
Women's events at the 1996 Summer Olympics